The Anand–Khambhat line belongs to  division of Western Railway zone in Gujarat State.

History

Anand–Petlad branch was opened in 1890. The length of Anand–Petlad branch was 21.84 km. Petlad–Tarapur branch and Tarapur–Khambhat branch was opened in 1901 respectively.

References

5 ft 6 in gauge railways in India
Railway lines in Gujarat